Celina Jaitly (born 24 November 1981) is an Indian actress who mainly appears in Bollywood films. She won the Miss India in 2001 and was the 4th runner-up at Miss Universe 2001. She made her acting debut with the 2003 thriller Janasheen.

Early life 
Celina Jaitly was born in Shimla, Himachal Pradesh, India to a Punjabi Hindu father, Colonel V. K. Jaitly and an Afghan Hindu mother, Meeta, who was a nurse in the Indian Army. Jaitly has a brother who is also in the army.

She wanted to grow up and join the army just like her father, either as a pilot or a doctor. Most of her childhood was spent in different locations due to her father being transferred in cities and towns all over India – as a result she ended up studying in over a dozen different schools. She attended City Montessori School, Station Road, Lucknow and Canossa Convent School, Ranikhet while her family was in respective cities. She graduated with a degree in Commerce with Accountancy (Hons.) from IGNOU (Khallikote College study centre) while her stay in Brahmapur, Odisha. Her mother taught in the DePaul School there. After graduation, Jaitly worked in a cell phone company in Kolkata, West Bengal briefly as a marketing executive. The family is now settled in Mhow.

Career

2001–04: Debut and setback 
Jaitly started her career with a marketing job in a mobile phone company in Kolkata before she decided to participate in a local beauty contest. She won the title at Femina Miss India 2001. She also won the Miss Margo Beautiful Skin, Indiatimes Surfer's Choice, and MTV's Most Wanted award. She was subsequently sent to the Miss Universe 2001 contest representing India where she finished 4th runner-up.

In 2001, she featured in Jazzy B's music video of "Oh Kehri", which was immensely popular. She also featured in music videos for Bombay Vikings.

In 2003, she made her film debut in Feroz Khan's Janasheen. The movie was a moderate box office success in India. For her second release, she had a starring role opposite Sunny Deol in the romantic action Khel, but the feature was poorly received and earned little at the box office.

In 2004, Jaitly turned down the lead role in Julie. In an interview with Stardust, Jaitly commented: "I turned down Julie because I didn't agree with the reasoning of the protagonist in the story, who resorts to prostitution because her man ditches her. I didn't see why any educated girl would take such a drastic step. I take up roles that I mentally agree with, and this was not such a role". The same years Celina appeared in the Telugu drama Suryam opposite Vishnu Manchu.

2005–08: Professional expansion 
By 2005, under the direction of Khalid Mohamed, Jaitly played the role of Preeti, an air hostess, in Silsiilay. The movie was well received by critics.
Rediff.com reported that "Celina Jaitly sizzles in the song Belibaas".

The following year, Jaitly co-starred in Deepak Tijori's comedy Tom, Dick, and Harry. She next appeared in Apna Sapna Money Money, directed by Sangeeth. In 2006, Jaitly appeared in the music video for the Indian hit song "Zara Nazron Se Kehdo" performed by Bombay Vikings with Swedish music producers Soundism behind the studio work.

In 2007, Jaitly starred in Red: The Dark Side, directed by Vikram Bhatt, alongside Aftab Shivdasani. Her final release of 2007 was Suneel Darshan's comedy Shakalaka Boom Boom, with Bobby Deol, Upen Patel and Kangana Ranaut. Upon release it did moderately well at the box office but was critically panned.

In 2008, she took a supporting role in Golmaal Returns. Jaitly's performance was applauded, with critic Taran Adarsh writing: "Celina stays on your mind even after the show is over".

Recent works (2009–present) 
During 2009 and 2010, all three films in which she starred; Paying Guests, Accident on Hill Road and Hello Darling, were critically and commercially unsuccessful.

In 2011, Jaitly had two leading roles. Her first was Anees Bazmee's Thank You, a romantic comedy.
 She next appeared in Shrimathi, a Kannada film directed by Ravi Kumar. It proved a commercial success.

There were reports in 2011 that Jaitly was slated to play a Persian princess in the film Quest of Scheherezade with actors Sean Connery and Orlando Bloom, and directed by Ken Khan. This has yet to be confirmed.

Personal life 

Celina Jaitly is married to Austrian entrepreneur and hotelier Peter Haag and they are parents to twin boys born in March 2012. Jaitly gave birth to a second set of twin boys in 2017, in which one boy died due to a heart defect.

Jaitly is currently based between Austria, Singapore, and Dubai and travels for her film and endorsement work internationally.

Endorsements 
Sepang Circuit Malaysia 2002, Ayur (ayurvedic hair shampoos) 2002–2004, Ponds (Dreamflower talc) 2001–2004, Margo (skin soap) 2001–2003, Gitanjali (Diamond jewels) 2003–present, Jashn (Leading Indian apparels) 2006–present, Proactv (International skin solutions) 2008–present, RICHFEEL (trichology clinics) 2012–present, 18 Again (women's intimate care) 2012–present, PETA 2005–present, United Nations Equality Champions 2013–present.

Filmography

References

External links 

 
 Official Website
 The Welcome

Living people
1981 births
People from Shimla
Actresses from Himachal Pradesh
Female models from Himachal Pradesh
Indian film actresses
Actresses in Hindi cinema
Actresses in Telugu cinema
Actresses in Kannada cinema
Punjabi Hindus
Indian Hindus
Indian people of Afghan descent
Indian emigrants to Austria
Indira Gandhi National Open University alumni
Femina Miss India winners
Miss Universe 2001 contestants
21st-century Indian actresses